Mushtaq Khan is an Indian film and television actor and comedian who has worked in several Hindi films in a career spanning three decades. He is best known for his roles in films like Hum Hain Rahi Pyar Ke (1993), Jodi No.1 (2001) and Welcome (2007).

Mushtaq was born in Baihar town of Balaghat district Madhya Pradesh to a Muslim family. He is widely known for his role of a disabled hockey player in the movie  Welcome (2007).

Filmography

Films

Albert Pinto Ko Gussa Kyon Aata Hai (1980) - The Lecherous Shopper trying to flirt with 'Joan Pinto' (Smita Patil)
Thodisi Bewafaii (1980) - Worker with sick wife - Mushtaq
laraz (1981) - as a butcher
Sazaye Maut (1981) - Actor
Kaalia (1981) - Ram deen
Vivek (1985)
Congregation (1986) - Banke Nawab aka "Anjuman"
Angaarey (1986) - Mustaq Khan
Kabzaa (1988) - Tiwari
Main Azaad Hoon (1989) - Pandey
Aakhri Ghulam (1989) - Actor
Aashiqui (1990) - Rafoo Master - Mustaque Khan
Baap Numbri Beta Dus Numbri(1990)- Police Inspector Dil Hai Ki Manta Nahin (1991) - Bus ConductorSaathi (1991) - ShettySadak (1991) - PimpLakshmanrekha (1991) - Dilawar LahoriZulm Ki Hukumat (1992) - Prabhakar Dharavi (1992) - ShankarSaatwan Aasman (1992) - Usman BhaiEk Ladka Ek Ladki (1992) - School TeacherJunoon (1992) - Adivasi BheemaAnaam (1992) - Inspector P.C. YadavPyar Pyar (1993) - Ram Sewak GaitondeAadmi (1993)Gunaah (1993) - Hotel ManagerLootere (1993) - JoshiPlatform (1993) - Arjun
 Sir (1993) - Kalu BaHum Hain Rahi Pyar Ke (1993) - Bhagwati Prasad MishraGumrah (1993) - Bombay Police InspectorKrantiveer (1994) - Babbanrao DeshmukhGopi Kishan (1994) - Police inspector MishraNaaraaz (1994) - Zafir KhanRaja (1995) - Banwarilal SanyalMilan (1995) - Havaldar ShantaramGuneghar (1995) - MaulviBaazi (1995) - Jamdaadey - Sub InspectorThe Don (1995) - PrajapatiSarhad: The Border of Crime (1995) - Mr. Lobo
English Babu Desi Mem (1996)Bambai Ka Babu (1996) - Commissioner - D.A. ChauhanChaahat (1996) - Waiter - AnnaYash (1996) - Sharafat AliAgni Prem (1996)Agnee Morcha (1997)Akele Hum Akele Tum (1997) - Lawyer Mr BhatijaMrityudata (1997) - Police Inspector DanapaniLahoo Ke Do Rang (1997) - Pappu ShikariMilitary Raaj (1998) -Minister ChedilalMajor Saab (1998) - Hanuman PrasadJab Pyaar Kisise Hota Hai (1998) - Singh 
Rajaji (film) (1999) - Kalicharan aka KadwaTeri Mohabbat Ke Naam (1999) - Police Constable PyarelalHera Pheri (2000) - Devi Prasad's servantHamara Dil Aapke Paas Hai (2000) Gadar Ek Prem Katha (2001) - Gul KhanJodi No.1 - (2001) - Casino Manager De CostaDal: The Gang (2001) - Banarasi
 Dil Ne Phir Yaad Kiya (2001 film)Be-Lagaam (2002) Policeman with Tanveer ZaidiEk Aur Ek Gyarah (2003) Inspector Bahadur Singh30 Days (2004) - Havaldar GangaramMujhse Shaadi Karogi (2004) - Chutki BabaRehguzar (2006) - ParvezSandwich (2006) - PopatlalKhallas: The Beginning of End (2007) - ShindeLife Mein Kabhie Kabhiee (2007) - Monica's AgentMy Friend Ganesha (2007)Welcome (2007) - BalluIshq Ho Gaya Mamu (2008) - Shayer e AazamBlack and White (2008) - Mohanlal Agarwal - MLAMehbooba (2008)Good Luck! (2008) - Tarun's General ManagerEk Vivaah... Aisa Bhi (2008) - Whistler in busOh, My God (2008) - Inspector RanaAasma: The Sky Is the Limit (2009) - Kamlesh PandeyShortkut - The Con is On (2009) - Gayetri's dadAakhari Decision (2010) - Ranjeet (as Mushtaque Khan)Wanted (2010) - Police inspector My Friend Ganesha 3 (2010) - Shivdhar Pandurang KambleApartment: Rent at Your Own Risk (2010) - Watchman MishraThat Girl in Yellow Boots (2011)Shagird (2011) - JailorRascals (2011) - UsmanRowdy Rathore (2012) - Baabji's assistantOnce Upon Ay Time In Mumbai Dobaara! - Aslam (Imran's Dad)Dee Saturday Night(2014)Dil Mangey Kuchh Aur (2014)Gurjar Aandolan A Fight for Right (2014) - Manohar Gurjar (Gurjar Leader) (Directed by Aarun Nagar)Haunted Rooh (2015) - Directed by Jitendra SinghBas Ek Chance (2015) - Gujarati Movie Directed By Kirtan PatelWelcome Back (2015) - BalluRomeo & Radhika (2016) Gujarati FilmMiss Teacher (2016) - Directed By Jai PrakashFinal Cut of Director (2016)When Obama Loved Osama (2018)Bala (2019) - Lawyer
 Dolly Kitty Aur Woh Chamakte Sitare (2020) Incredible India  (2020)Secret Pocketmaar (2021)Before You Die (2022)Hai Tujhe Salaam India (2022)Acting Ka Bhoot (2022)Saurashtra (2022)

TelevisionZee Horror Show as Gangva mayuri Father in Aafat Kuch Rang Pyar Ke Aise Bhi - Baldev Tripathi (2016–17)Adaalat - Jhillmill "KD's Friend" (2010–11)Chacha ChaudharyTedhe Medhe Sapne - (2001)Chamatkar - N.D. Tiwari (1996)Devta - (1999)Hum Sab Ek Hain - (1999) (Episode 66)Bharat Ek Khoj(1988)....Miyan Buvan episode 31-Rana Sanga, Ibrahim Lodhi and BaburWagle Ki Duniya(1988).... as Manohar- episode LandlordNukkad(1986)....as Prabhakar- episode Mystery Woman
 Belan Wali Bahu (2018) as Premnath Avasthi
 Kuch Rang Pyar Ke Aise Bhi Season 3 - Baldev Tripathi (2021)
 Hume Toh Loot Liya'' (2023)...MX Player film

Awards

References

External links 
 
 
 

Living people
Indian male film actors
Male actors in Hindi cinema
Male actors from Madhya Pradesh
Indian male television actors
Indian male comedians
20th-century Indian male actors
21st-century Indian male actors
People from Balaghat district
Year of birth missing (living people)